Deer Run is an unincorporated community located in Pendleton County, West Virginia, United States. The community takes its name from the stream that runs through it. Deer Run is a quiet community that contains a former post office and country store. Since abandoned in the 1960s. The lack of employment opportunities has forced many from this community to move to other areas for work.

References

Unincorporated communities in Pendleton County, West Virginia
Unincorporated communities in West Virginia